Təhlə (also, Taklya) is a village and municipality in the Barda Rayon of Azerbaijan.  It has a population of 140.

References 

Populated places in Barda District